The Dutch Eerste Divisie in the 1973–74 season was contested by 20 teams. Excelsior won the championship.

New entrants
Relegated from the 1972–73 Eredivisie
 FC Den Bosch
 Excelsior
HVC changed their name to SC Amersfoort for this season.

League standings

Promotion competition
In the promotion competition, four period winners (the best teams during each of the four quarters of the regular competition) played for promotion to the eredivisie.

See also
 1973–74 Eredivisie
 1973–74 KNVB Cup

References

Netherlands - List of final tables (RSSSF)

Eerste Divisie seasons
2
Neth